The 2014–15 Cupa Ligii was the first official season of the Cupa Ligii. The winner, Steaua București, was not granted a place in the UEFA Europa League, but received €265,000.

All times are CEST (UTC+2).

Schedule 
 Play-off round: 16 July 2014
 Round of 16: 18–21 July 2014
 Quarter-finals: 12–14 December 2014
 First leg of semi-finals: 17–18 February 2015
 Second leg of semi-finals: 10–11 March 2015
 Final: 20 May 2015

Prize money 
 Winner: 265.000€
 Runner-up: 165.000€
 Semi-final: 50.000€
 Quarter-final: 25.000€
 Round of 16: 20.000€
 Play-off round: 10.000€

Play-off round

Round of 16

Quarter-finals

Semi-finals

1st leg

2nd leg

Final

References

Cupa Ligii seasons
Cupa